Songshrike may refer to any of several birds of the family Cracticidae including:

 the bell-magpie
 the butcherbird
 the currawong

Animal common name disambiguation pages